Ruben Jille (born 11 July 1996) is a Dutch badminton player, specializing in doubles play. The righthanded Jille, started playing badminton at a small local club in Houten, the place where he grew up. He chose to join the national team in 2014. In 2016, he was semi-finalist at the Dutch Open partnered with Jacco Arends in the men's doubles event. In 2017, this partnership won its first international title at the Spanish International.

Achievements

European Championships 
Men's doubles

BWF World Tour (1 title)
The BWF World Tour, which was announced on 19 March 2017 and implemented in 2018, is a series of elite badminton tournaments sanctioned by the Badminton World Federation (BWF). The BWF World Tour is divided into levels of World Tour Finals, Super 1000, Super 750, Super 500, Super 300, and the BWF Tour Super 100.

Men's doubles

BWF Grand Prix (1 runner-up) 
The BWF Grand Prix had two levels, the Grand Prix and Grand Prix Gold. It was a series of badminton tournaments sanctioned by the Badminton World Federation (BWF) and played between 2007 and 2017.

Men's doubles

  BWF Grand Prix Gold tournament
  BWF Grand Prix tournament

BWF International Challenge/Series (2 titles, 2 runners-up) 
Men's doubles

Mixed doubles

  BWF International Challenge tournament
  BWF International Series tournament
  BWF Future Series tournament

References

External links 
 

1996 births
Living people
People from Nieuwegein
Dutch male badminton players
Sportspeople from Utrecht (province)
21st-century Dutch people